The 2016 Internationaux Féminins de la Vienne was a professional tennis tournament played on indoor hard courts. It was the 20th edition of the tournament and part of the 2016 ITF Women's Circuit, offering a total of $100,000 in prize money. It took place in Poitiers, France, on 24–30 October 2016.

Singles main draw entrants

Seeds 

 1 Rankings as of 17 October 2016.

Other entrants 
The following player received a wildcard into the singles main draw:
  Amandine Hesse
  Fiona Ferro
  Elizaveta Kulichkova
  Chloé Paquet

The following players received entry from the qualifying draw:
  An-Sophie Mestach
  Andreea Mitu
  Natalia Vikhlyantseva
  Caitlin Whoriskey

The following players received entry by special exempts:
  Elena Gabriela Ruse
  Maryna Zanevska

Champions

Singles

 Océane Dodin def.  Lauren Davis, 6–4, 6–2

Doubles

 Nao Hibino /  Alicja Rosolska def.  Alexandra Cadanțu /  Nicola Geuer, 6–0, 6–0

External links 
 2016 Internationaux Féminins de la Vienne at ITFtennis.com
 Official website 

2016 ITF Women's Circuit
2016 in French tennis
Internationaux Féminins de la Vienne